The Brighton Lawn Tennis Club Tournament was an early men's tennis tournament held from 1880 through 1885.

History
The Brighton Lawn Tennis Club Tournament was established in 1880. In 1882, it became an open event for men and women called the Brighton Lawn Tennis Club Tournament Open was a brief pre-open era tennis tournament played on outdoor grass courts at Brighton and Hove, England there was just three editions of this event two time U.S. National Champion James Dwight won the final edition in 1885.

Past tournaments
Incomplete list of tournaments included:

Men's singles

Notes

References

External links
http://www.tennisarchives.com/Tournaments 1885

Grass court tennis tournaments
Defunct tennis tournaments in the United Kingdom
Recurring sporting events established in 1880
1880 establishments in England
1885 disestablishments in England
Sport in Brighton and Hove